Edifício Itália (Portuguese for "Italy Building") (whose official name is Circolo Italiano) is a  tall 46-story skyscraper located in the República district, Central Zone of São Paulo, Brazil. Built from 1956 to 1965, it has a rooftop observation deck, open for tourists.

Edifício Itália was designed by Brazilian architect Franz Heep. It is the 3rd tallest building in Brazil (and the 2nd in São Paulo) after Millennium Palace and Mirante do Vale.

Design and facilities
The building's facade was designed to create natural ventilation and stable internal air while protecting tenants from the direct sunlight.

Terraço Itália Restaurant
Inaugurated on 29 September 1967, the Terraço Itália Restaurant is one of the best known restaurants in the city, located at the 41st floor, with wide views to the city's southern zone. In 1968, the restaurant was visited by Queen Elizabeth II.

The Bar do Terraço is a bar with live music located on the 42nd floor. It faces the northern zone of the city and the Serra da Cantareira. It has access to the terrace, the building's observatory.

Sala São Paulo
The Sala São Paulo is a famous room for corporate and social events located in the 41st floor.

See also
List of tallest buildings in São Paulo
List of tallest buildings in Brazil
List of tallest buildings in South America

References

External links
 Terraço Itália
 Skyscraper Page
 

Central Zone of São Paulo
Skyscrapers in São Paulo
Buildings and structures completed in 1965
Tourist attractions in São Paulo
Skyscrapers in Brazil